

Irish Name

The original Gaelic form of Cahal was Mac Cathail or O Cathail, while is derived from the personal name Cathal, which is generally Anglicized as Charles. Cahal is derived from the Old Irish "catu-ualos" which means "valor or powerful in battle".

Early Origins of the Cahal surname

The surname Cahal was first found in County Kerry and Tipperary as there are at least two distinct septs of the name. The first sept from County Kerry descend from the Heremon line of kings and were known as the Cahills of Connaught. The second sept claim descent from the Ir line of kings and were located at Corkashinny, or the parish of Templemore, Tipperary. This line further branched to the eponymous Ballycahill, Tipperary. Both branches descended from O'Connors, the Kings of Connacht, specifically "Cathal," also known as Conor na Luinge Luaithe, when anglicized means "Conor, the Swifter-Sailing Ship" which may allude to the seafaring coat of arms used by the family.

People with the surname
Terry H. Cahal (1802–1851), American politician

People with the given name
Cahal Carvill (born 1987), Northern Irish hurler 
Cahal Daly (1917–2009), Irish philosopher
Cahal Dunne (born 1951), Irish singer

References